Tuaopepe John Joseph Ah Kuoi (born 14 July 1957) is a former Samoan rugby union player. He played as a centre.

Career
John Ah Kuoi is from a prominent Samoanfamily, with Chinese heritage in addition. He moved to Auckland as a 12-year-old for his schooling, but kept his ties with Samoa, representing the country in 12 rugby tests in the 1980s. He played for Auckland in the NPC in the 1980s. His first cap for Samoa was for a match against Fiji, at Suva, on 22 August 1987 and his last cap was against Tonga, at Tokyo, on 11 April 1990.

Personal life
On leaving school, he gained a private pilot licence, but a career in aviation did not materialise. He married and became an insurance salesman. The couple moved to Italy for a year, where John played rugby with his brother-in-law, All Black John Kirwan.

After returning to New Zealand, John worked in a business selling uniforms, soon branching out with his own sports uniform business. Together with his wife Sue, he ran this business for 19 years. In 2009, he returned to his first job as insurance advisor, this time with the Maurice Trapp Group.

John plays golf, and has continued rugby coaching for many years.

References

External links
John Ah Kuoi international statistics
John Joseph Ah Kuoi at New Zealand Rugby History

1957 births
Living people
Samoan rugby union players
Rugby union centres
Samoan expatriate sportspeople in New Zealand
Samoan people of Chinese descent
Samoa international rugby union players
Auckland rugby union players
Samoan expatriate rugby union players
Expatriate rugby union players in New Zealand